Syrphus opinator is a species of syrphid fly in the family Syrphidae.

References

Syrphinae
Syrphini
Articles created by Qbugbot
Taxa named by Carl Robert Osten-Sacken
Insects described in 1877